The Bon Secours Charity Health System, part of the Bon Secours Health System (USA), was established from a partnership between the Sisters of Bon Secours and the Sisters of Charity of Saint Elizabeth of Convent Station, New Jersey. The system includes:  Good Samaritan Regional Medical Center in Suffern, New York, Bon Secours Community Hospital in Port Jervis, New York and St. Anthony Community Hospital in Warwick, New York.

On May 20, 2015, Westchester Medical Center in Valhalla, New York announced that it would become the majority corporate member of BSCHS. WMC will actively manage the Bon Secours Charity Hospitals and associated facilities. The combination of BSCHS and existing WMC facilities gives the new network 1500 inpatient hospital beds, 166 nursing home beds, 2800 physicians, and a workforce of over 10,000.

External links
Bon Secours Charity Health System

Hospital networks in the United States
Health charities in the United States
Non-profit organizations based in New York (state)
Medical and health organizations based in New York (state)